Frederick Courtland Kenyon (November 22, 1867 – January 11, 1941) was an American zoologist and anatomist best known for his research into the anatomy of the insect brain. In 1896, he published a paper in which he first described the neurons in the mushroom bodies of the honey bee. Later, the same neurons were discovered in other insects and were called Kenyon cells.

Frederick C. Kenyon was born in Hartford, Connecticut, the son of a shoe merchant. In 1887, he moved with his family to Lincoln, Nebraska, where in 1893 he received a bachelor's degree from the State University. He received his doctorate in 1895 from Tufts University, where he studied Pauropoda centipedes. He worked for about two years at Clark University, where he prepared his famous work on the mushroom bodies of the honey bee. In his early thirties he began to display strange behavior, and on November 25, 1899, he was committed to a psychiatric hospital in Washington, D.C., where he remained for over forty-one years.

References

This article was created by translating the equivalent article on the Russian Wikipedia on 19 January 2022.

1867 births
1941 deaths
American entomologists
American naturalists
University of Nebraska–Lincoln alumni
Tufts University alumni
Clark University faculty